Reikvam is a surname. Notable people with the surname include:

Åsmund Reikvam (born 1944), Norwegian professor in medicine and former politician
Rolf Reikvam (born 1948), Norwegian politician

Norwegian-language surnames